Jan Blahoslav (20 February 1523 – 24 November 1571) was a Czech humanistic writer, poet, translator, etymologist, hymnographer, grammarian, music theorist and composer. He was a Unity of the Brethren bishop, and translated the New Testament into Czech in 1564. This was incorporated into the Bible of Kralice.

Life
Blahoslav was born in Přerov, Moravia.  He studied theory under Listenius and Hermann Finck at University of Wittenberg from 1544. At Wittenberg he became acquainted with Martin Luther, and he was also acquainted with Philipp Melanchthon.  After a short period at Mladá Boleslav (1548–9) he continued his education at Königsberg and Basle. He was a linguist who strove to preserve the purity of his native tongue and succeeded in bridging the gulf between Christianity and humanism. He was ordained at Mladá Boleslav in 1553, and became a bishop of the Fraternity of Czech (or Moravian) Brethren in 1557. In the following year he established himself at Ivančice, where before long he installed a printing press. Towards the end of his life he moved to Moravský Krumlov, where he died, aged 48.

Blahoslav was the editor of the 1561 Czech-language hymnal of the Unity, a hymnal which was reprinted and revised at least 10 times over the next 50 years. His Muzika (1558) -- a "theoretical instruction book for the singing of hymns" -- has been called "the first book in Czech presenting the theory of music and singing."

Blahoslav's work influenced Jan Amos Komenský.

Works 
 O původu Jednoty – Rules of Unity
 Filipika proti misomusům
 Gramatika česká – Czech Grammar
 Bratrský archiv 
 Naučení mládencům 
 Akta Jednoty bratrské – Rules of the Unity of the Brethren
 Rejstřík skladatelů bratrských písní

Works on music 
 Muzika (Olomouc, 1558) – On Music
 Šamotulský kancionál (1561) – Cantionale
 Věčný králi, pane náš – Song published in Staročeské hymny a písně (Old Czech Hymns and Songs) (1940)

Bibliography 
 Brown, Marshall T., Jan Blahoslav: Sixteenth-Century Moravian Reformer, Edinburgh, The Banner of Truth Magazine, Issue 544, January 2009, pp. 1–9.

See also 
 List of Czech writers
 Slavic translations of the Bible

References

External links 
Biography 

1523 births
1571 deaths
People from Přerov
16th-century bishops
Czech male writers
Czech composers
Czech male composers
Czech translators
Writers of the Moravian Church
Bishops of the Moravian Church
Czech people of the Moravian Church
Translators of the Bible into Czech
16th-century hymnwriters
16th-century Christian biblical scholars
Czech biblical scholars
Czech Protestant clergy